Jean-Pierre Melville (born Jean-Pierre Grumbach; 20 October 1917 – 2 August 1973) was a French filmmaker and actor. Among his films are Le Silence de la mer (1949), Bob le flambeur (1956), Le Doulos (1962), Le Samouraï (1967), Army of Shadows (1969) and Le Cercle Rouge (1970).

While with the French Resistance during World War II, he adopted the pseudonym Melville as a tribute to his favorite American author Herman Melville. He kept it as his stage name once the war was over. Spiritual father of the French New Wave, he has influenced new generations of filmmakers across the world.

Life and career
Jean-Pierre Grumbach was born in 1917 in Paris, France, the son of Berthe and Jules Grumbach. His family were Alsatian Jews.

After the fall of France in 1940 during World War II, during which he was evacuated from Dunkirk as a soldier in the French Army, Grumbach entered the French Resistance to oppose the German Nazis who occupied the country. He adopted the nom de guerre Melville after the American author Herman Melville, a favourite of his.

When he returned from the war, he applied for a license to become an assistant director but was refused. Without this support, he decided to direct his films by his own means, and continued to use Melville as his stage name. He became an independent filmmaker and owned his own studio, rue Jenner, in Paris 13ème.

He became well known for his minimalist film noir, such as Le Doulos (1962), Le Samouraï (1967) and Le Cercle rouge (1970), starring major actors such as Alain Delon (probably the definitive "Melvillian" actor), Jean-Paul Belmondo and Lino Ventura. Influenced by American cinema, especially gangster films of the 1930s and 1940s, he used accessories such as weapons, clothes (trench coats), and fedora hats, to shape a characteristic look in his movies.

Melville ultimately became so identified with the style that The New Yorkers Anthony Lane wrote the following about a 2017 retrospective of his films: This is how you should attend the forthcoming retrospective of Jean-Pierre Melville movies at Film Forum: Tell nobody what you are doing. Even your loved ones—especially your loved ones—must be kept in the dark. If it comes to a choice between smoking and talking, smoke. Dress well but without ostentation. Wear a raincoat, buttoned and belted, regardless of whether there is rain. Any revolver should be kept, until you need it, in the pocket of the coat. Finally, before you leave home, put your hat on. If you don't have a hat, you can't go.

Melville's independence and "reporting" style of film-making (he was one of the first French directors to use real locations regularly) were a major influence on the French New Wave film movement. Jean-Luc Godard used him as a minor character in his seminal New Wave film Breathless. When Godard was having difficulty editing the film, Melville suggested that he just cut directly to the best parts of a shot. Godard was inspired and the film's innovative use of jump cuts have become part of its fame. In an interview, Melville claimed editing was his favorite part of the filmmaking process along with writing.

Although a friend of left-wing icons such as Yves Montand and thought of himself as a communist in the 30's, Melville referred to himself as "an extreme individualist" and "a right-wing anarchist" in terms of politics.

In 1963 he was invited as one of the jury at the 13th Berlin International Film Festival.

Death

Melville died on 2 August 1973 while dining with writer Philippe Labro at the Hôtel PLM Saint-Jacques restaurant in Paris; the cause of death has been variously given as a heart attack or a ruptured aneurysm. He was 55 years old. Melville was then writing his next film, Contre-enquête, a spy thriller for producer Jacques-Éric Strauss with Yves Montand in the lead. Melville apparently wrote the first 200 shots for the film. After Melville's death, Labro took over the project, hoping to finish writing and direct it, but he eventually dropped it to film Le hasard et la violence (1974), also starring Montand and for producer Strauss.

Filmography

As director & writer

As actor

Code Name Melville
Produced in 2008, the 76-minute-long feature documentary Code Name Melville (original French title: Sous le nom de Melville) reveals the importance of Jean-Pierre Melville's personal experience in the French Resistance during World War II to his approach to filmmaking.

References

Footnotes

Sources

 
 Eric Breitbart (2006). "Call Me Melville". New England Review 27:3. pp. 174–183
 Montero, José Francisco, Jean-Pierre Melville. Crónicas de un samurái, Editorial Shangrila, Santander, 2014. Shangrilaediciones.com
 Bertrand Tessier. Jean-Pierre Melville: Le solitaire. Fayard, 2017.

Further reading
Ginette Vincendeau Jean-Pierre Melville: An American in Paris, 2003, BFI Publishing, 
Tim Palmer "An Amateur of Quality: Postwar Cinema and Jean-Pierre Melville's LE SILENCE DE LA MER," Journal of Film and Video, 59:4, Fall 2006, pp. 3–19
Tim Palmer "Jean-Pierre Melville's LE SAMOURAI", in Phil Powrie (ed.) The Cinema of France, 2006, Wallflower
Tim Palmer "Jean-Pierre Melville and 1970s French Film Style," Studies in French Cinema, 2:3, Spring 2003
Bertrand Tessier "Jean-Pierre Melville, le solitaire", Editions Fayard, Paris, 2017. The first Jean-Pierre Melville biography. "The resistance period is informed on a different way through unpublished documents" (Le monde) 
 23 November 2017, Biographie. Jean-Pierre Melville, le parrain

External links
 
 Bibliography of books and articles about Melville via UC Berkeley Media Resources Center
 Biography on newwavefilm.com
 [http://www.wsws.org/articles/2006/aug2006/sff8-a15.shtml Jean-Pierre Melville World Socialist Web Site]
 Article at Senses of Cinema

1917 births
1973 deaths
20th-century French male actors
20th-century French screenwriters
Alsatian Jews
Film directors from Paris
French Army personnel of World War II
French Jews
French film directors
French male film actors
French male screenwriters
Jewish French writers
French Resistance members
Jews in the French resistance